The 1950 Detroit Titans football team represented the University of Detroit in the 1950 college football season. Detroit outscored its opponents by a combined total of 226 to 143 and finished with a 6–3–1 record in its sixth year under head coach Chuck Baer. It was the 56th season of intercollegiate football for the University of Detroit.

The Titans had won the Missouri Valley Conference (MVC) championship in 1949 and were co-favorites with Tulsa to win the conference championship in 1950.  The Titans ultimately finished in second place behind Tulsa.

Two Titans were selected as first-team players on the 1950 All-Missouri Valley Conference football team: guards Alex Smail and Ed Wood.

Dutch Clark, later inducted into both the Pro and College Football Halls of Fame, joined the Titans' staff as backfield coach in 1950. Bob Ivory and Eddie Barbour were also assistant coaches for the 1950 team.  Bob O'Malley and Mike Kaysserian were hired to coach the freshman team.

End Tom Costello and Nick Galante were co-captains of the 1950 team.  After the season, fullback Mike Goggins and tackle Joe Kutz were named captains of the 1951 team.

In late December 1950, Chuck Baer resigned as the Titans' head football coach, citing "personal reasons". The resignation was considered a surprise, but followed rumors of a shakeup after the university president, the Very Rev. Celestin J. Steiner, appointed a committee to investigate and make recommendations about the university's entire athletic program.

Schedule

Players
 Ed Beirne, end
 Tom Costello, end and co-captain
 Miles Currie, end
 Nick Galante, guard and co-captain
 Mike Goggins, fullback
 Ron Horwath, left halfback
 Danny Kerins, tackle
 Johnny "Red" O'Connor, quarterback
 Jack O'Leary, right halfback
 Dick Neveux, quarterback
 John Packo, center
 Alex Smail, guard
 Lee Wittmer, tackle
 Ed Wood, guard

See also
 1950 in Michigan

References

External links
 1950 University of Detroit football programs

Detroit
Detroit Titans football seasons
Detroit Titans football
Detroit Titans football